Central Dabaris is a semi-professional rugby league club that will be competing  in its 3rd season in  the 2021 Papua New Guinea National Rugby League season.

2022 squad

References

Rugby league in Papua New Guinea
Papua New Guinean rugby league teams